Kandelia candel is a species of mangrove in the family Rhizophoraceae, found around the coasts of South Asia and Southeast Asia, from western India to Borneo. Populations further east, from Vietnam to Japan were formerly included in K. candel, but are now considered a separate species, K. obovata.

Description
Its flaky bark is lenticellate and coloured greyish to reddish brown. The flowers are white.

References

Mangroves
Rhizophoraceae
Flora of tropical Asia
Plants described in 1753
Taxa named by Carl Linnaeus